The E.R. Johnstone Training and Research Center was a mental institution in Bordentown, Burlington County, New Jersey, United States, that housed people with developmental disability.  Located adjacent to the Juvenile Medium Security Center in Bordentown, and listed in the National Register of Historic Places, the Edward R. Johnstone Training and Research Center opened in 1955 after the state closed the New Jersey Manual Training and Industrial School for Colored Youth as a result of the 1954 decision in the US Supreme Court case of Brown v. Board of Education. It was posthumously named in honor of Edward R. Johnstone. The building housing the females was damaged in a 1983 fire.

John M. Wall was the Superintendent from 1969 until his retirement in 1990.
  
Johnstone became the first large institution shut down by the state amid controversy over whether institutional residents could survive in a community setting. Follow-up quality of life information was collected about 225 former residents, and they were found to have fared better in group homes or supervised apartments than residents sent to other hospitals. Those who moved into community-based housing were more likely to get jobs, ride public transportation, go to restaurants and otherwise integrate into society. The study has been cited as an example of the benefits of deinstitutionalization.  The validity of this study has been questioned for those residents who were placed in the community were done so due to their greater suitability to community living.

References

United Press International (July 8, 1983). Fire Damages Building at State Home in New Jersey.
Staff report (January 22, 1998). Study Shows That Some Do Better in Group Homes. The New York Times
Apgar DH, Cook S, Lerman P. Life After Johnstone:  Impacts  on Consumer Competencies, Behaviors, and Quality of Life. (PDF)
Johnston, Mark V., Vanderheiden. Gregg C., Farkas. Marianne D., E., Rogers, Sally, Summers, Jean Ann, Westbrook, John D.  The National Center for the Dissemination of Disabilities Research (September 16, 2013)The Challenge of Evidence in Disability and Rehabilitation Research and Practice

External links
Development Disabilities Planning Institute

Hospital buildings completed in 1955
Bordentown, New Jersey
Psychiatric hospitals in New Jersey
Buildings and structures in Burlington County, New Jersey
Special schools in the United States
National Register of Historic Places in Burlington County, New Jersey
Hospital buildings on the National Register of Historic Places in New Jersey
1955 establishments in New Jersey